Charalkunnu is a popular hill station in Thiruvalla Taluk, Pathanamthitta District of Kerala, India.  The Pampa River flows in the low-lying areas. Pathanamthitta, the district headquarters, is situated 17 km to the south-east.  Kozhencherry is located 5 km away.

It is around 10 km from Ranni and around 20 km from Tiruvalla.

References
There is a convention centre at Charelkunnu which is used by Marthoma, local and political people.
 http://www.ecotours.in/charalkunnu-h.htm

Geography of Pathanamthitta district